Cristina Ramos may refer to:

Cristina Ramos-Jalasco, Filipino sports executive and former international footballer
Cristina Ramos Pérez, Spanish singer, winner of Got Talent España in 2016